Series 3 of the ITV programme Foyle's War was first aired in 2004; comprising four episodes, it is set in early 1941.  Series 3 was broadcast in the United States on PBS on Mystery!, on 11, 18, and 25 September, and 2 October 2005 as Foyle's War III, and on Netflix as of April 2014.

Episodes

"The French Drop"

Cast and characters
In Hastings, Foyle and Milner (whose marriage is now breaking up) spend time dealing with petty crimes and black marketeers. Foyle, wanting to do more to help the war effort, goes to the Admiralty to see his brother-in-law Commander Charles Howard in hope of being offered a job at Naval Command in Liverpool. This ultimately fails. Foyle also has a run-in at SOE with an ex-con called Mason (alias Leo Maccoby) whom he had helped to send to prison some three years earlier. Stewart returns to her hometown with Foyle, and they meet her uncle Aubrey Stewart, the local vicar. This episode features the second of three appearances by the recurring character Hilda Pierce, played by Ellie Haddington (previously in the Series 2 episode "War Games", and then in the Series 5 episode "All Clear"); she then becomes a lead character in Series 8.

Background and production
The title of the episode is taken from the phrase "French drop", which is a well-known vanishing trick involving sleight of hand. Horowitz was also inspired by the Special Operations Executive, which Churchill created in 1940 to develop techniques of sabotage and subversion. By setting the story in the early days of the SOE, Horowitz was able to use the conflict between the new SOE and the older yet under-prepared Security Service and Secret Intelligence Service as a backdrop to the plot. Many of the details are authentic, such as the use by the SOE of carborundum powder to disable cars,  and some characters are based on people involved with the SOE, such as the former Shanghai Municipal Police officer William E. Fairbairn and Hilda Pierce, based on the real-life Vera Atkins. Throughout the episode, numerous people are also seen carrying around gas masks in small cardboard boxes with a carry string attached, indicating the concern about possible chemical weapon attacks of the time.

"Enemy Fire"

Cast and characters
Foyle is shown visiting the grave of his wife on the ninth anniversary of her death. The tombstone reads: "Rosalind Foyle, June 1902-February 1932, RIP". Wrenn is the surgeon who had amputated Milner's leg. Andrew Foyle receives a promotion to flight lieutenant and is transferred to a training position by Wing Commander Turner, who understands his burnout and the service he has already performed.

Background and production
The hospital and its patients are broadly based on the work of Archibald McIndoe and his "guinea pigs". Waterford's story of battle-fatigue and self-injury 25 years ago parallels that of Woods' injuries and Andrew Foyle's stress in this war. Andrew Foyle's transfer to a training position at an Operational Training Unit (OTU) is slightly inaccurate. 605 Squadron was a front line unit February 1941, and RAF Debden did not have an OTU until March 1941 when No. 52 OTU formed to train fighter pilots using the Hawker Hurricane, so it would be unlikely for him to fly a Spitfire to a unit with Hurricanes. The scenes at the "factory" where Ann Preston worked, were filmed at IWM Duxford's Hangar 3, featuring The Old Flying Machine Company's Spitfire from Series 1.

"They Fought in the Fields"

Cast and characters
Foyle is shown to understand German (in addition to French from the last episode) due to his service in the previous war. He also explains that he was part of a police football team that played while in Germany in 1936. Stewart is scoffed at by Dillon because of her "cushy" driving job, and she decides to help the Land Girls with the potato crop.

Background and production
With the air and sea campaigns around the UK, a number of POW camps were set up, as depicted in this episode. The programme also focuses on the voluntary service of the Women's Land Army, started by the government in June 1939 to increase agricultural production.

"A War of Nerves"

Cast and characters
In this episode, it is revealed that Sergeant Eric Rivers, who normally mans the police station's front desk, has a daughter named Gwen. Further, Stewart agrees to testify on behalf of Jack Archer, Gwen's fiancé, later agreeing to be her bridesmaid.

Background and production
The Chatham Dockyards provided the location for the shipyard, featuring both HMS Ocelot and HMS Cavalier. The shipyard racket is based on a real case of fraud by Frederick Porter of Liverpool in 1942, whose ship scaling business embezzled over £300,000 from the government. Rose also invokes Defence Regulation 18B as an extra-legal means of getting to Carter. The episode ends with the announcement of Operation Barbarossa, the German invasion of the Soviet Union.

International broadcast
Series 3 was broadcast in the United States on PBS on Mystery!, on 11, 18, and 25 September, and 2 October 2005 as Foyle's War III, and on Netflix as of April 2014.

References

External links 
 Series 3 on IMDb

Fiction set in 1941
Foyle's War episodes
2004 British television seasons